Molla Hanina Synagogue is one of the smallest and oldest synagogues in Tehran. It is located in the historic Jewish neighborhood of Oudlajan. The land of the synagogue has an area of just . The synagogue was created in the 19th century AD during the time of Mozaffar ad-Din Shah Qajar. Molla Hanina Melamed Yazdi is known to have created the synagogue. Molla Hanina died in 1283 SH (1904–1905 AD) and the synagogue was managed by the council since then. The synagogue was also a precursor of the Dr. Sapir Hospital and Charity Center which is the only Jewish hospital in Tehran, as Dr. Sapir used to treat patients in one of the rooms of the synagogue. Today the population of Jews in Oudlajan is relatively low and the synagogue is only open on Sabbaths.

References 

Synagogues in Tehran
Buildings of the Qajar period